Beckwithia may refer to:
 Beckwithia (arthropod), an arthropod genus in the order Aglaspidida
 Beckwithia (plant), a plant genus in the family Ranunculaceae